The Marcus Daly Memorial Hospital, located at 211 S. 4th St. in Hamilton in Ravalli County, Montana was listed on the National Register of Historic Places in 1978.

It was named in memory of Marcus Daly.

References

National Register of Historic Places in Ravalli County, Montana
Colonial Revival architecture in Montana
Hospital buildings completed in 1930
Hamilton, Montana
Hospital buildings on the National Register of Historic Places in Montana
1930 establishments in Montana